Eugene Victor "Gene" Lux (August 16, 1926 – June 21, 2019) was an American politician of the Democratic Party. He was a member of the Washington House of Representatives, representing the 35th Legislative District and then the 11th Legislative District for more than six and five years, respectively. Lux was also appointed to two brief stints in the Washington State Senate in the 35th and 11th legislative districts in 1973 and 1988, respectively.

In 2009, Lux unsuccessfully ran for the office of King County, Washington Assessor. As of 2017, the 91 year-old Lux was serving his seventh four-year term as Commissioner of King County Fire District 20. He died on June 21, 2019, aged 92.

He was born in Lincoln, Nebraska and worked as a self-employed building contractor.

References

1926 births
2019 deaths
Politicians from Lincoln, Nebraska
Democratic Party Washington (state) state senators
Democratic Party members of the Washington House of Representatives